Aneta "Anca" Pătrășcoiu (born 17 October 1967) is a retired Romanian swimmer who won the bronze medal in the 200 meter backstroke event at the 1984 Summer Olympics. This was the first Olympic medal in Romanian swimming history. She retired in 1990 to become a swimming coach.

References

External links 

 
 
 

1967 births
Living people
Sportspeople from Baia Mare
Olympic swimmers of Romania
Olympic bronze medalists for Romania
Swimmers at the 1984 Summer Olympics
Swimmers at the 1988 Summer Olympics
European Aquatics Championships medalists in swimming
Medalists at the 1984 Summer Olympics
Romanian female backstroke swimmers
Romanian female butterfly swimmers
Romanian female freestyle swimmers
Romanian female medley swimmers
Universiade medalists in swimming
Universiade gold medalists for Romania
Universiade silver medalists for Romania
Medalists at the 1987 Summer Universiade